"Don't Stop Me Now" is a song by the British rock band Queen featured on their 1978 album Jazz that was released as a single in 1979. Written by lead singer Freddie Mercury, it was recorded in August 1978 at Super Bear Studios in Berre-les-Alpes (Alpes-Maritimes), France, and is the twelfth track on the album.

The song also appears in the band's 1981 compilation album Greatest Hits, and in June 2011, as part of Queen's 40th anniversary celebrations, an old take of the song containing more guitar parts was included on the bonus EP of the re-released and remastered Jazz album. Featuring in films, commercials, and television shows, the song has grown in popularity in the four decades since its release. Bobby Olivier of Billboard attributes its initial rebirth to its appearance in the 2004 cult classic zombie apocalypse film Shaun of the Dead. In 2014, Rolling Stone readers voted it their third-favourite song by Queen.

Background
The song was written by Freddie Mercury during the sessions for Jazz. The band felt they were "getting better at having a good time" and the lyrics reflect this. Musically, the song builds on Mercury's piano playing, with John Deacon and Roger Taylor providing a bass guitar and drums backing track. The song also provides an example of Queen's trademark style of multitrack harmony vocals for the chorus lines.

An alternative version of the song, with a harder, guitar-driven arrangement, appeared on Bohemian Rhapsody: The Original Soundtrack issued in 2018, billed as "Don't Stop Me Now... Revisited".

Reception
The single reached number 9 in the UK charts but only number 86 in the US; as the album was a top-10 hit, the song got some airplay on U.S. album-oriented rock stations despite its low chart ranking as a single. Despite this, the song has grown in stature with time and has been popularised not only by consistent airplay, but by its use in advertisements, television programmes and films, and through cover versions. It has subsequently become one of Queen's most popular songs. The song was voted as the third-best Queen song by readers of Rolling Stone, who noted that "time has also been very kind to it and it's widely seen now as one of the group's best works." The single also has reached platinum status in the United Kingdom. In a March 2019 Billboard article titled, "The Evolution of Queen's 'Don't Stop Me Now': How a Minor Hit Became One of the Band's Most Beloved (And Inescapable) Songs", Bobby Olivier wrote,

Alexis Petridis of The Guardian wrote that the "astonishing" song "may be Queen's greatest song of all". He felt it was "a direct product of [Mercury's] hedonism and promiscuity: an unrepentant, joyous, utterly irresistible paean to gay pleasure-seeking. You find yourself wondering if its title might not have been aimed at his censorious bandmates." Mike Orme of Stylus Magazine ranked it the 7th-greatest penultimate track on an album, calling it Queen's "most flamboyant and energetic single" and commenting: "Essentially three and a half minutes of Freddie Mercury jacking the mike from the rest of the world, the song offers him a chance to let us know just how much fun he's having in the spotlight." Billboard praised Brian May's guitar solo and also stated that the song was "less gimmick laden" than Queen's previous single from Jazz, "Bicycle Race"/"Fat Bottomed Girls", "while still retaining the brazen braggadocio of Freddie Mercury's lead vocals." Cash Box said it has "vocal dramatics and varied arrangements by Mercury" and "beautifully layered vocals and regal guitar work from May".  Record World called it a "fast paced tune with that easily identifiable Freddy Mercury lead vocal and Brian May guitar."  The television show Top Gear voted it the Greatest Driving Song Ever.

Criticism
Despite its popularity, Brian May was not originally a fan of the song as he felt it was celebrating the hedonistic and risky lifestyle of Mercury, which he thought was threatening. He added that he struggled with the lyrics at the time, because it was about a difficult period in Freddie's life when the singer was "taking lots of drugs and having sex with lots of men". However, after hearing the song being played at weddings, parties and funerals, he has come to appreciate it as representing "great joy".

Music video
The video for the song was directed by J. Kliebenstein and filmed at the Forest National, Brussels, Belgium on 26 January 1979.

Live performances
Viewed at the time of release as one of the lesser songs in the Queen canon, it was only performed live during 1979, with the last performance in the Crazy Tour. On the studio version, Brian May's only guitar playing is in his guitar solo, but on live versions performed on the band's 1979 Jazz and Crazy tours, May would also play rhythm guitar throughout the rest of the song to give more of a rock feel. A live version of the song features in the band's 1979 album Live Killers.

Queen reintroduced the track to their set in the 2010s with Adam Lambert and it is now a popular live favourite.

Personnel
Queen:
 Freddie Mercury – lead and backing vocals, piano
 Brian May – electric guitar, backing vocals
 Roger Taylor – drums, percussion, tambourine, triangle, backing vocals
 John Deacon – bass guitar

Charts

Year-end charts

Revisited version

Sales and certifications

McFly version

In 2006, English band McFly covered "Don't Stop Me Now" and released it as a double A-side single with original track "Please, Please". The release, titled "Don't Stop Me Now" / "Please, Please", is the first single from their third album, Motion in the Ocean. It premiered on BBC Radio 1 on 7 June 2006. The double A-side entered the UK Singles Chart at number one on 23 July 2006, knocking "Smile" by Lily Allen off the top spot. It also reached number 15 in Ireland.

Music video
The video for "Please, Please" was the band's most "enjoyable video shoot". It was shot in an old hospital and featured each of the members McFly being admitted to hospital with various injuries and being taken care of by a red-headed nurse named Lindsay Albright. The video caused some controversy as the band appear naked in one scene, and BBC and Channel 4 both refused to show the video even though T4 on Channel 4 showed the exclusive of the video. Fletcher said, "I wasn't at all embarrassed about being naked – we're used to stripping off in front of each other. But there was one sticky moment where I didn't realize how low my guitar was and I almost flashed everything on camera!"

Charity
Some of the money from any version of the single went to Sport Relief and as a result their version of "Don't Stop Me Now" was played across the BBC's sport programmes, including highlights from the 2006 FIFA World Cup. It also was the theme for the "Sport Relief Mile", which McFly also took part in. Judd also travelled to India for Sport Relief with a collection of other British celebrities including presenter and comedian Nick Hancock and radio DJ and presenter Chris Evans. Whilst out in India, Harry took part in a cricket tournament, travelling across India's poorest areas and playing with everyone from the kids to the professionals, all in aid of Sport Relief.

Track listings

UK CD1
 "Don't Stop Me Now"
 "Please, Please" (radio version)

UK CD2
 "Please, Please" (single version)
 "Don't Stop Me Now"
 "5 Colours in Her Hair" (US version)
 "5 Colours in Her Hair" (live from Arena Tour)
 "5 Colours in Her Hair" (live video)
 "Harry in India for Sport Relief"

UK DVD single
 "Please, Please" (audio)
 "Don't Stop Me Now" (audio)
 "I've Got You" (US version)
 "I've Got You" (US movie video)
 "Please, Please" (video)
 Behind the scenes at the "Please, Please" video shoot

Charts

Weekly charts

Year-end charts

Other versions 
Cover versions include:
 Foxes covered the song on the 11 October 2014 episode of Doctor Who, "Mummy on the Orient Express". A music video was subsequently released by the BBC to publicise series 8 of the rebooted show.
 The Vandals, on their 2004 album Hollywood Potato Chip.

References

Bibliography

External links
 
 Don't Stop Me Now – The Story Behind The Song at Wow-Vinyl

1978 songs
1979 singles
Queen (band) songs
The Vandals songs
Songs written by Freddie Mercury
Song recordings produced by Roy Thomas Baker
EMI Records singles
Elektra Records singles
Hollywood Records singles
British power pop songs
LGBT-related songs
British pop rock songs
British hard rock songs
2006 singles
McFly songs
Charity singles
Comic Relief singles
Island Records singles
Number-one singles in Scotland
UK Singles Chart number-one singles
Universal Records singles